The 2001 FIVB World Grand Prix was the ninth women's volleyball tournament of its kind.

Teams

Preliminary rounds

Ranking

|}

First round

Group A
Venue: Suphanburi, Thailand

|}

Group B
Venue: Kowloon, Hong Kong

|}

Second round

Group C
Venue: Harbin, China

|}

Group D
Venue: Kaohsiung, Taiwan

|}

Third round

Group E
Venue: Harbin, China

|}

Group F
Venue: Tokyo, Japan

|}

Final round
Venue: Macau

Pool play

Group A

|}

|}

Group B

|}

|}

Final four

Semifinals

|}

7th place match

|}

5th place match

|}

3rd place match

|}

Final

|}

Final ranking

Individual awards

Most Valuable Player:

Best Scorer:

Best Spiker:

Best Blocker:

Best Server:

Best Digger:

Best Setter:

Best Receiver:

References
FIVB
Volleyball Almanac

FIVB World Grand Prix
2001 in Chinese sport
International volleyball competitions hosted by China
2001
FIVB Volleyball World Grand Prix